Syncosmetus is a genus of tree-fungus beetles in the family Ciidae.

Species
 Syncosmetus japonicus Sharp, 1891

References

Ciidae genera